In numerical analysis, one or more guard digits can be used to reduce the amount of roundoff error.

For example, suppose that the final result of a long, multi-step calculation can be safely rounded off to N decimal places.  That is to say, the roundoff error introduced by this final roundoff makes a negligible contribution to the overall uncertainty.

However, it is quite likely that it is not safe to round off the intermediate steps in the calculation to the same number of digits.  Be aware that roundoff errors can accumulate.  If M decimal places are used in the intermediate calculation, we say there are M−N guard digits.

Guard digits are also used in floating point operations in most computer systems. Given  we have to line up the binary points. This means we must add an extra digit to the first operand—a guard digit. This gives us . This gives us a relative error of 1. Therefore, we can see how important guard digits can be.

An example of the error caused by floating point roundoff is illustrated in the following C code.

int main(){
   double a;
   int i;

   a = 0.2; 
   a += 0.1; 
   a -= 0.3;

   for (i = 0; a < 1.0; i++) 
       a += a;

   printf("i=%d, a=%f\n", i, a);

   return 0;
}
It appears that the program should not terminate. Yet the output is :  i=54, a=1.000000

Another example is:

Take 2 numbers: 

 and 

The addition of the 2 numbers is:

0.0256*10^2 
2.3400*10^2 +  
 
2.3656*10^2 

After padding the second number (i.e.) with two s, the bit after  is the guard digit, and the bit after is the round digit.

References
 Forman S. Acton.  Numerical Methods that Work, The Mathematical Association of America (August 1997).
 Higham, Nicholas J. Accuracy and Stability of Numerical Algorithms, Washington D.C.: Society for Industrial & Applied Mathematics, 2002.
 IEEE 754 round-off errors

Numerical analysis
Articles with example C code